Noah23 is a Canadian-American underground hip hop artist from Guelph, Ontario.  His discography consists of twenty-eight solo albums, four collaboration albums, sixteen EPs, eleven mixtapes, five compilations, three physical singles, and many guest appearances on other artists' tracks.

Labels
Noah23's first two official albums were released through his own record label Plague Language (in 2001/2). The label went on indefinite hiatus in 2004, and since then the majority of his albums have been released on Canadian sister-label Legendary Entertainment (with a Plague Language imprint), which is owned and managed by his frequent collaborator Crunk Chris. He has also released two albums and one single with German label 2nd Rec (in 2003/4), one EP and one single with short-lived Canadian label Northstar Imprint (in 2003/4), one EP with American label Vermin Street (in 2010), and one album with American label Fake Four Inc. (in 2011). Many of his albums and mixtapes in recent years have been self-released through Bandcamp, with some of these subsequently receiving physical releases via Legendary Entertainment.

Discography
In the following discography, collaboration albums are defined as full-length albums (LPs) credited to multiple vocalists. Albums credited to a vocalist/producer duo (e.g. CRUNK23 releases) are treated as solo albums. EPs, mixtapes and compilations are not differentiated on the above basis.

Solo albums

Collaboration albums
Collaboration albums are defined as full-length albums (LPs) credited to multiple vocalists. Albums credited to a vocalist/producer duo (e.g. CRUNK23 releases) are treated as solo albums.

EPs

Mixtapes
Mixtapes are defined as albums featuring production predominantly taken from the work of other musical acts.

Compilation albums
Compilation albums are defined as albums composed predominantly of previously released material.

Singles
A list of singles that received physical releases.

Guest appearances
The below is an incomplete list of Noah23 guest appearances on releases by other artists.
2001
 Id Obelus - "They Call Me" from Talking to Machines (2001)
2002
 Baracuda - "Deadly Rays", "Dental Plan" & "Duplicate Version" from Tetragammoth (2002)
 The Twin Sisters - "A Bike a Horse a Tree" from Amulet (2002)
 Penny - "Antique Couplings" from The Clockforth Movement (2002)
2003
 Id Obelus - "They Call Me" from There's Blood in the Ashtray (2003)
2004
 Feelix - "Homewood" from Critical Focus (2004) (track also appears on Mitochondrial Blues (2004))
 Livestock - "Coconut Bomb" from Spiral Like the 9 (2004) (track also appears on Sigma Octantis (2004) as an untitled bonus track and on Pirate Utopias (77 Lost Scrolls) (2011))
2005
 Homesick - "Shell Shock Rock" from Tangent Wars (2005)
 Optikz - "Gods of Thunder" from Area Fifty One Nine Cover Ups (2005)
 Scott da Ros - "They Made Me Do It" from "They Made Me Do It" [single] (2005) (track also appears on Cameo Therapy (2007))
2006
 Vert - "Yrs" from Some Beans & an Octopus (2006) (track also appears on Cameo Therapy (2007))
2007
 Livestock - "Isis Hathor" from The Afterlife of Jazz (2007) (track also appears on Pirate Utopias (77 Lost Scrolls) (2011))
 Livestock & Leon Murphy - "Anarcho-Taoists" from The Rawganic EP (2007) (track also appears on Upside Down Bluejay (2008))
2008
 Baracuda - "Off the Hook" from Knucklebone (2008) (track also appears on Pirate Utopias (77 Lost Scrolls) (2011))
 Bleubird - "Ripe Figs Remix" from Street Talk 2 (2008) (track also appears on Upside Down Bluejay (2008))
 Factor - "Electric Furs of a Lynx" from Chandelier (2008) (track also appears on Pirate Utopias (77 Lost Scrolls) (2011))
 Id Obelus - "The Amplification of Amputation" from The Inevitable Crushing (2008) (track also appears on Pirate Utopias (77 Lost Scrolls) (2011))
 Josh Martinez & DJ Zone - "Moonlanding" from The World Famous Sex Buffet: Mixed Tape CD  (2008) (track also appears on Rock Paper Scissors (2008))
 The Main - "Roach and the Beetle" & "Rosey Rockbottom" from The Glass Slipper (2008) ("Rosey Rockbottom" also appears on Plague Language Compilation (2009))
 Normal Oranges - "Last Great Fix" from $5 Mic (2008)
 Scott da Ros - "Mega Posse Cut: Fuck You, We Don't Need You" (2008)
 Smear One - "Help" from Airies Rising (2008) (track also appears on Upside Down Bluejay (2008))
2009
 1111 - "Today's Society" from I Want to Be a Janitor's Child (2009)
 Blee - "True Cat" from Solution (2009) (track also appears on Pirate Utopias (77 Lost Scrolls) (2011))
 Bleubird - "Ripe Figs Remix Remix" from Street Talk 5 (2009)
 The Motherboard - "Motherload" from "Motherload" [single] (2009)
 StapleMouth - "Dead End Game" from Ruler of Desperate Measures (2009) (track also appears on Rock Paper Scissors (2008))
 StapleMouth - "10 Kings (Mega Tuff)", "Micron Helium Balloons" & "Trilateral Damage" from Un-Everything Except Three (2009) ("Micron Helium Balloons" also appears on Cameo Therapy (2007); an abridged version of "Trilateral Damage" appears on Mitochondrial Blues (2004); "10 Kings (Mega Tuff)" & "Trilateral Damage" are alternate versions of the same song)
2010
 All Things Invisible - "King of the End Times" from Gas & Dust (2010)
 Blee - "Writing a Book" from Cosmos Road (2010) (track also appears on Pirate Utopias (77 Lost Scrolls) (2011))
 Factor - "Periodic Table" from Old Souls Vol. 2 (2010)
 Factor - "Sacrifice" from 13 Stories (2010) (track also appears on Pirate Utopias (77 Lost Scrolls) (2011))
 Livestock - "Nazca Plateau" & "Raw Nukes" from For My Man Sittin' on a Boat (2010) (tracks also appear on Clout (2006) and Rock Paper Scissors (2008) respectively)
 The Notorious BEN - "I Comes 1st" from Interdimensional Surfboard (2010)
 Wormhole - "When (Twilight Minotaur Remix)" from Ouroboros (2010)
 Wormhole & Sapience - "Fortune Cookie" from The Mo'o (2010) (track also appears on Pirate Utopias (77 Lost Scrolls) (2011))
 Zoën - "Magistrate" from One Night Between (2010) (track also appears on Pirate Utopias (77 Lost Scrolls) (2011))
2011
 Blown - "Jordan" from Slam Dunk Contest Vol. 1 (2011)
 C. Banks - "The Come-Up" (2011) (track also appears on Pirate Utopias (77 Lost Scrolls) (2011))
 D.O.H. the Joker - "Bludgeon" from The Quickening (2011)
 En2ak - "Intolerable Kid" & "Smoke" from Celestial Toyroom (2011) (tracks also appear on Pirate Utopias (77 Lost Scrolls) (2011) and Upside Down Bluejay (2008) respectively)
 Factor - "High" from Club Soda Series 1 (2011) (track also appears on Rare Gems (2014))
 Hobs Sputnik - "The End" from Satellite Strange (2011)
 Lost Planet - "Crazy Thoughts" from Lost Planet (2011)
 The Main - "Flowers of Evil", "The Fishin' Song" & "Alabama Tick" from Clamnesia (2011)
 Murk-a-Troid - "Red Panties (It's Over)" from Heavens to Murk-a-Troid (2011) (track also appears on Rare Gems (2014))
 Nomar Slevik - "Northern Trajectory" from In the Field Where I Died (2011)
 Sole and the Skyrider Band - "We Will Not Be Moved" from Hello Cruel World (2011)
2012
 Chryso - "Flow" from Demons Run (2012) (track also appears on Rare Gems (2014))
 Jesse Dangerously - "Slept Through a Landslide" from "Slept Through a Landslide (Tired Angels Remix)" [single] (2012) (track also appears on Rare Gems (2014))
 Th' Mole & Friends - "Bloody Peaches (Romanticore)" from Love in the Chaosphere (2012)
 Ovate & StapleMouth - "Pazuzu Coil" from The Ogre Ephemeris (2012) (an abridged version of this track appears on Rare Gems (2014))
 Playpad Circus - "Sculpting Supernova" from Phantasma (2012)
 Shady Blaze - "Another Dimension" from The Grind, Hustle & Talent (2012) (track also appears on Rare Gems (2014))
 Sixo - "Daggers" from Tracking Perception EP (2012) (track also appears on Noah23 for Dummies (2012))
 Spz Chaote - "Stuntin' Like Jupiter" from The Voice of an Era (2012)
 Supa - "Mellow" from Weird Is the New Cool (2012) (track also appears on Rare Gems (2014))
2013
 Black Lab Productions - "The Four Horsemen" from The Black Lab Mixtape (2013)
 Blood Stained Phoenix -  "Unclasp" from Post Modern Mechanics (2013) (track also appears on Rare Gems (2014))
 Blown - "Acid Rain" from Cloudy Daze (2013) (track also appears on Rare Gems (2014))
 Deft Aphid - "Open Like a Browser" from HardeNET (2013) (track also appears on Rare Gems (2014))
 Dior Sentai - "Sword & Sandal" from http:/ /WeWin.Edu (2013) (track also appears on Rare Gems (2014))
 DotCult - "Naughty by Nature" from The Three Beggars (2013) (track also appears on Rare Gems (2014))
 Greencarpetedstairs - "Keep It Soaked" from 1222 (2013)
 Gregory Pepper & Madadam - "House on Wheels" from Big Huge Truck (2013) (track also appears on Upside Down Bluejay (2008))
 Molly Gruesome - "Going Gonzo" from Spitfire (2013) (track released as single in 2012; also appears on Rare Gems (2014))
 Notorious BEN - "Human Horse Race" from Mind of Many Voices (2013)
 Party Trash - "Start It Up" (2013) (track also appears on Rare Gems (2014))
 Psynlangwage - "We Do It Great" from Closed Captions (2013)
 Shady Blaze - "Another Dimension 2.0" from Green Ova's Most Hated (2013)
 Swag Toof - "D.G.A.F. Boyz" (2013) (track also appears on Rare Gems (2014))
2014
 Party Trash - "Money & Music" & "Riddles & Conundrums" from Melt (20 Jan) ("Money & Music" also appears on Rare Gems (2014))
 Bo Gus & Uncle Ando - "Fingers Crossed" from Half There (23 Jan)
 DotCult - "Mouf" from #YFB (4 Feb)
 Zachg - "The Shine" from South Florida Mountains (20 Apr)
 Pictureplane - "Tropical Fruit" from The Alien Body Mixtape (1 May) (track also appears on Tropical Fruit (2013))
 Yawning Boy - "Diddy at Burning Man (Remix)" from "2 Remixes" (27 May)
 mcenroe - "Petroleum Soda" from Burnt Orange (20 Aug)
 Drummachinemike - "Sound Investments" & "The Catapult" from Drum Machine Music (23 Sep)
 Lil Tofu - "Space" from Soy (21 Oct)
 Clops & Kevork - "Porterhouse" from Ayo Man, Wanna Rap on This Track? Vol. 2 (28 Oct)
2015
 88 Ultra - "A Thousand & One" from Sirens (14 Jan)
 Bom Trvdy - "Half-Time" from Foxboro (1 Feb)
 Skyscrvpxr - "SoulEaters" (18 Feb)
 AJ Suede - "Necronomicon" from Gold and Earth (4 Mar)
 Sortahuman - "Dry" from Sortahuman4Life (8 Mar)
 Mosch - "Mutated Communications" (24 Mar)
 88 Ultra & No Merci - "Glowing" & "We Could Never Be" from Para Bellum (1 Jul)

Tracks appear on
 "Octave" on Persona Non Grata #58: The Magnificent Seven [2nd Rec disc] (Persona Non Grata, 2003) (track also appears on Quicksand (2002))
 "Nova Toast" on The MadstAttic Mixtape (BrainKave Productions, 2003) (track also appears on Jupiter Sajitarius (2004))
 "Amnesia" on Bassments of Badmen, Vol. 2 (Hand'Solo Records, 2003)
 "Soylent Brown" & "Tokyo Strings" on Farewell Archetypes (Plague Language, 2004)
 "Saw Palmetto" on Lastebil (Debris from a Fragmented Culture Vol. 1) (2004) (track also appears on Quicksand (2002))
 "Crypto Sporidian" on 21 Loops in Pang (Debris from a Fragmented Culture Vol. 5) (Hansen & Nilsen, 2004) (track also appears on Quicksand (2002))
 "Freelance Zenarchist" on Mind the Gap Vol. 53 (Gonzo Circus, 2004) (track also appears on Jupiter Sajitarius (2004))
 "Crunch" on sUPERIORbelly (Compilation) (sUPERIORbelly, 2005) (track also appears on Pirate Utopias (77 Lost Scrolls) (2011))
 "Photo Soul Decay" on Sónar 2005 (Sonarmusic, 2005) (track also appears on Jupiter Sajitarius (2004))
 "Nocturnal" & "Soylent Brown" on Top 40 Suicide / Hypodraulics (Vulgar, 2005) ("Nocturnal" also appears on Quicksand (2002))
 "Digestive Enzymes" on Orchestrated B-Boy Screams (Vulgar, 2005) (track also appears on Quicksand (2002))
 "Spider Dollie" on Hue and Laugh and Cry: Sounds of Humming Hip Hop (Hue Records, 2006) (track also appears on Amalthea Magnetosphere (2006))
 "Fathom (Up Remix)" on Du Ska Inte Tro Det Blir Sommar: Beats, Breaks & Big Smiles Vol. 2 (Beats, Breaks & Big Smiles, 2007)
 "Chicken Pox" on 2nd Rec Sampler (2nd Rec, 2007) (track also appears on Jupiter Sajitarius (2004))
 "Iggy Igloo" on The Motherboard Compilation: Intel Inside (Secret Cloud, 2008) (track also appears on Pirate Utopias (77 Lost Scrolls) (2011))
 "Ill Shit" on Survival: True Stories from the Underground (SIQ Records, 2008)
 "Keep The Channel Locked" on Hokey Religions & Ancient Weapons (Are No Match for a Good Blaster) (Hand'Solo, 2008)
 "Probability Bandits" on Free Shabazz (Ricky Shabazz and the Boom Bap Boys, 2010) (track also appears on Vision and Voice (2011))
 "Bright Green Laces" on A Record Label Sampler Vol. 2 (Fake Four Inc., 2010) (track also appears on Fry Cook on Venus (2011))
 "Sea of the Infinite Wave (Le Parasite Remix)" on A Record Label Sampler Vol. 3 (Fake Four Inc., 2011) (track also appears on Fry Cook on Venus (2011))
 "New Dawn" on Underground Hip-Hop Vol. 7 (Urbnet, 2011) (track also appears on The Terminal Illness EP (2011))
 "Bleeding Edge So Wet" on Theway Peoplestare: One Year Anniversary (Mundo Urbano, 2011) (track also appears on Occult Trill II: The Sun Rewinds (2011))
 "Twilight Hours" on Grim Harvest (Mishka, 2012) (track also appears on Rare Gems (2014))
 "Solitary Man" on Digital Flowerings Vol. 1 (Internet Hippy, 2014)
 "Swag Safari" on Friends of the Universe (Dior Sentai, 2015)

Miscellaneous tracks
The below is an incomplete list of tracks that have not appeared on any official release, either by Noah23 or others. Some dates are estimated; some titles are unofficial.
 "Operation Mindfuck" (1998) (featuring Fippad)
 "Biological Film" (2003) (featuring Stella Maris; produced by Rev. Left)
 "Beauty Is a Curse" (2006) (featuring Homesick & Livestock)
 "G" (2006) (featuring Hangnail & Livestock)
 "Posse Cut" (2006) (featuring Baracuda, DS, Lord Kufu, The Main & Tykus)
 "Rough Weather" (2006) (featuring DS & Tykus, produced by Madadam)
 "Executioner" (2007) (featuring The Main, produced by Crunk Chris)
 "Every New Day (Factor Mash Up)" (2009) (music by Factor)
 "Black Lab Mixtape Verse" (2010) (produced by Thavius Beck; an abridged version of "The Four Horsemen" from The Black Lab Mixtape (2013) by Black Lab Productions)
 "Red Panties (It's Over)" (2010) (featuring CrashDDZ & MaxSevenEight, produced by Richard Herrell; a remix of this track by RK Beatmaker appears on Rare Gems (2014))
 "Yawn Freestyle" (2010)
 "Broken Mandala" (2011) (as SabrToof)
 "The Come Up" (2011) (featuring C. Banks; an abridged version of this track appears on Pirate Utopias (77 Lost Scrolls) (2011))
 "Crack Genie" (2011) (as SabrToof)
 "Devour" (2011) (as SabrToof)
 "Divine Bewilderer (Haris the Terrist Mix)" (2011)
 "Even Keel" (2011) (produced by Slew)
 "Factory Setting" (2011) (as SabrToof)
 "Hippy Jazz Apocalypse (Freestyle)" (2011)
 "Holy Are You (Freestyle)" (2011) (music by Nick Wiz)
 "Keep My Name Off Ya Lips" (2011) (featuring Modulok, produced by Madadam)
 "Nature Plex" (2011) (as SabrToof)
 "Nuts (Demo Fuzz Mix)" (2011) (featuring Liz Powell, produced by Cars & Trains)
 "Sea of the Infinite Wave (Dynamo414 Remix)" (featuring Ceschi & Myka 9)
 "Sea of the Infinite Wave (Expanding Ripples Leifkolt Remix)" (featuring Ceschi & Myka 9)
 "Sea of the Infinite Wave (Le Parasite Remix)" (featuring Ceschi & Myka 9; an abridged version of this track appears on Noah23 for Dummies (2012))
 "Shallots Freestyle" (2011) (featuring Baracuda & Tykus; music by MF Doom)
 "Sink Your Teeth In" (2011) (as SabrToof)
 "So Cool" (2011) (featuring The Main; music by MF Doom)
 "Theme" (2011) (as SabrToof)
 "Too Deep to Sleep" (2011) (featuring Livestock & The Main; produced by Madadam)
 "Dark Light" (2012) (featuring Baracuda, Lord Kufu & The Main)
 "Levitating Chariots" (2012) (featuring Lord Kufu & The Main)
 "Mechanical Bull (Chopped & Screwed)" (2012) (featuring Baracuda)
 "Makin' a Movie" (2013) (produced by Madadam)
 "Red Panties (Chukchee Remix)" (2013) (featuring CrashDDZ & MaxSevenEight, produced by Chukchee)
 "Retro Specks" (2013) (produced by Khalil Nova; appeared on the sampler Gold Vol. 3 by music blog Jealous Gold)
 "Tropical Fruit (Remix)" (2013) (produced by Live Action Fezz)

Music videos
The below is a list of music videos containing original footage (videos composed entirely of excerpts from other material are excluded).
"Edgar Cayce" (11 November 2006) (from Technoshamanism (2006))
"Cranky Banditz" (15 March 2008) (from Bourgeois Cyborgs (2008))
"Bright Green Laces" (22 May 2010) (from Fry Cook on Venus (2011))
"Fame" (27 September 2010) (from Rock Paper Scissors (2008))
"Genius Madman" (30 December 2010) (from Noah23 / Playpad Circus (2010))
"Factory Setting" (4 March 2011) (as SabrToof)
"Intangible Heart Crescendo" (2 July 2011) (from Fry Cook on Venus (2011))
"Do What Thou Wilt" (8 August 2011) (from Occult Trill: The Witch-Tape (2011))
"Crosses + Roses" (8 August 2011) (from Occult Trill: The Witch-Tape (2011))
"Drag Star" (22 September 2011) (from Occult Trill II: The Sun Rewinds (2011))
"No Summer" (10 October 2011) (from Occult Trill II: The Sun Rewinds (2011))
"Hunchback of Ontario" (24 October 2011) (from Occult Trill II: The Sun Rewinds (2011))
"Carpe Diem" (21 November 2011) (from Illegal Ideas Inc. (2011))
"Renegades" (7 December 2011) (from Occult Trill II: The Sun Rewinds (2011))
"Burning Bridges" (5 September 2012) (from Vision and Voice (2011))
"Hollow Earth" (6 September 2012) (from Heart of Rock (2010))
"Tropical Fruit" (28 January 2013) (from Tropical Fruit (2013))
"Wingfoot" (23 April 2013) (from Wingfoot (2012))
"The Script" (19 August 2013) (from Occult Trill III: Blast Master Therion (2013))
"Silent Night" (19 December 2013) (from XXXMAS by Fame Corp (2010))
"Diddy at Burning Man" (14 May 2014) (from Delicate Genius (2014))
"Jaguar" (23 July 2014) (from Occult Trill III: Blast Master Therion (2014))
"Glory of the Light" (21 December 2014) (from Occult Trill III: Blast Master Therion (2014))
"Zeta Beta" (3 April 2015) (from Noah23 x Blown (2015))
"Terence McKenna" (8 April 2015) (from Peacock Angel (2015))
"Heaven" (21 April 2015) (from Vision and Voice (2011))
"Phantasy" (24 May 2015) (from Peacock Angel (2015))
"Dust" (21 June 2015) (from Noah23 x Blown (2015))
"Vegas" (23 June 2015) (from Noah23 x Blown (2015))
"Yin Yang Pinky Ring" (26 July 2015) (from Peacock Angel (2015))
"Based Rock n Roll" (14 July 2016) (from Zoom (2011))
"Days That We Livin In" (26 July 2016) (from Discordian Pope (2016))
"Feng Shui" (27 July 2016) (from Peacock Angel (2015))
"Super String" (3 August 2016) (from Discordian Pope (2016))
"Blood" (29 September 2016) (from Blood (2014))
"Down for the Cause" (12 October 2016) (from Light Years (2014))
"Scarlet" (28 October 2016) (from Occult Trill III: Blast Master Therion (2013))
"Best to Ever Do It" (19 September 2017) (from Aquarian Alien (2015))
"Headphones" (31 July 2019) (from Light Years (2014))
"Forever in a Day" (16 July 2020) (from Wingfoot (2012))
"How Many" (23 September 2020) (from Peacock Angel (2015))
"Illuminati Christmas Party" (18 December 2020) (from Illuminati Christmas (2015))
"23 'Til Infinity" (24 July 2021)
"Dark Cry$tal" (31 July 2021) (from Peacock Angel (2015))

References

Hip hop discographies
Discographies of American artists
Discographies of Canadian artists